
Wodzisław County is a unit of territorial administration and local government (powiat) in Silesian Voivodeship, southern Poland, on the Czech border. It came into being on 1 January 1999 as a result of the Polish local government reforms passed in 1998.

As of 2019 its total population is 157,346, out of which the population of Wodzisław Śląski is 47,992, that of Rydułtowy is 21,616, that of Radlin is 17,776, that of Pszów is 13,896, and the rural population is 56,066.

History
Wodzisław area was heavily influenced by the Duchy of Racibórz, Duchy of Wodzisław and Wodzisław State country in the Middle Ages and later. First Wodzisław county was created in 1954. It covered vast area, including current Wodzisław County and Jastrzębie-Zdrój. In 1975 administrative reforms repealed counties (powiaty) in Poland. In 1999 Jerzy Buzek government restored Wodzisław county (without Jastrzębie) along with other counties.

Neighbouring counties
Wodzisław County is bordered by Racibórz County to the west, the city of Rybnik and Rybnik County to the north-east, and the city of Jastrzębie-Zdrój to the east. It also borders the Czech Republic to the south.

Administrative division
The county is subdivided into nine gminas (four urban and five rural). These are listed in the following table, in descending order of population.

Sights
Wodzisław Śląski
 the gothic church of "Sante Trinity" from 15th century (Kościół św. Trójcy), erected in 1257 year
 the Monastery from 17th century ( "Klasztor franciszkański" ), erected in 1257 year
 the neo-gothic church of "Assumption of St. Mary" (Kościół WNMP)
 the building of the former district authority (19th century)
 the neo-classical Wall tower (Baszta rycerska)
 the Classicism Palace oldest in Poland from 1745 year. (Today Museum)
 the old town square (Rynek),
 the Palace in Kokoszyce (Pałac w Kokoszycach) 1823 year
Rydułtowy
 Scales building KWK "Rydułtowy" (coal mine)
 Rail Tunnel
 St. George's Church
Radlin
 Assumption of St. Mary's church

Twin regions
Wodzisław County is twinned with:
 Recklinghausen (district), Germany

See also 
Silesia Euroregion

References

 
Land counties of Silesian Voivodeship